John McEnroe was the defending champion, but did not participate this year.

Anders Järryd won the title, defeating Mats Wilander 6–4, 3–6, 7–5 in the final.

Seeds

Draw

Finals

Top half

Bottom half

External links
 ATP main draw

1985 Grand Prix (tennis)
Donnay Indoor Championships